Ali Agha Ismail Agha oghlu Shikhlinski;  – ) was an Azerbaijani lieutenant-general of the Russian imperial army, Deputy Minister of Defense and General of the Artillery of Azerbaijan Democratic Republic and a Soviet military officer.

Life and military career

Early life 
Ali Agha Shikhlinski was born on April 23, 1865, in the village of Kazakhly (now Ashaghy Salakhly), in Kazakh uyezd of Elisavethpol Governate. He wrote that his father, Ismayil Agha, was a member of the Shikhlinski Dynasty, a noble family dating back to as early as 1537. Shikhlinski wrote at the "Officer's Notebook", a journal he has been working on since 1904, that his mother, Shah Yemen Khanum was the grandchild of Molla Vali Vidadi, an 18th-century poet. Ali Agha Shikhlinsky also had two brothers.

Early Military Career 

In August 1876 Shikhlinski entered Tiflis military school and graduated in 1883. He continued his education at Mikhailovsky Artillery Academy in Saint Petersburg as a Junker. He was a capable student, excelled as a cavalryman and as a gymnast. Upon graduation from the first grade school, on August 11, 1886, Ali Agha Shikhlinski was promoted to podporuchik and was assigned to the 39th Artillery Brigade stationed in the city of Alexandropol (now Gyumri). In the course of military service he was promoted to poruchik, then shtabs-kapitan and appointed as commander of the training team. In 1900, Captain Shikhlinski was transferred to Transbaikal Artillery Battalion in Eastern Siberia. He was appointed to the Battery Chief of Transbaikal Artillery Division in the detachment, as well as chairperson of the Artillery Committee, he repeatedly carried out the authorizations of battalion and division commanders. He took part in China Relief Expedition of the Russian Imperial Army.

Russo-Japanese War 

During the Russo-Japanese War Shikhlinski was the commander of an artillery battery. He distinguished himself during the siege of Port Arthur when, despite being severely wounded in his leg, he personally aimed the guns which lost their gun crews and repulsed attacks of superior Japanese forces.

For the services in battle on September 28, 1905, he was decorated with the Order of Saint George 4th degree. He was also awarded a Saint George Sword and conferred the rank of lieutenant-colonel.

Officer's Artillery College 

In January 1906, Shikhlinski was seconded to Tsarskoye Selo Officer's Artillery College, which he finished with honors in August of the same year and was appointed the instructor of the Artillery College. During his service as the instructor of the college Shikhlinski published a number of works on artillery, including a book titled “Use of Field Artillery in a Battle”, and invented an original target-finding device, which was called “Shiklinski triangle”. In 1908 Shiklinski was promoted to the rank of colonel, and in 1912 he was conferred the rank of major-general and assigned the deputy chief of Officer's Artillery College.

World War I

When World War I started in 1914 Ali-Agha Shikhlinski was appointed the commander of St. Petersburg garrison artillery. In January 1915, Shikhlinski was seconded to the Northwestern front to manage the training of heavy artillery guncrews. On May 23, 1915, he was appointed the general for errands at the commander-in-chief of the Northwestern front, and after division of the front into two held the same position at the Western front. On October 31, 1915, he was appointed to the position of the general for errands at the Supreme Commander-in-Chief. He was charged with the creation of heavy artillery battalions and brigades. From April 1916 16, Shikhlinski was the acting inspector of Western Front artillery. He was in charge of the artillery aspects of operations of the Western Front. On April 2, 1917 Ali Agha Shikhlinski was promoted to the rank of lieutenant-general.

Azerbaijani National Army 
After the February Revolution in Russia, Ali Agha Shikhlinski was appointed the commander of the 10th Russian army in September 1917. After the October revolution, he resigned from his position and moved to Tiflis, where he was charged with formation of the Muslim (Azerbaijani) corps. The corps supported the Ottoman Army of Islam in the Battle of Baku with Bolshevik and British forces. In January 1919, the government of Azerbaijan Democratic Republic appointed Shikhlinski a deputy to the Minister of Defense of Azerbaijan Republic Samad bey Mehmandarov. On June 28, 1919, Ali-Agha Shikhlinski was promoted to the rank of General of the Artillery of the Azerbaijani army. After the Red Army invasion of Azerbaijan and establishment of the Soviet regime in Azerbaijan in April 1920, Shikhlinski was arrested and released two months later.

Red Army 

In 1920–1921, he was seconded to Moscow, where he was an adviser to the artillery inspection department of Red Army and taught in Higher Artillery School. On 18 July 1921, Shikhlinski was transferred back to Baku, where he taught at a military school and became a deputy to the chairman of the military science society of Baku garrison. In 1926, Shikhlinsky published the Russian-Azerbaijani Concise Military Dictionary. He resigned from military service in 1929 and wrote his memoirs, which were published in 1944.

Death 

He spent his last days in his house, apartment 14 of Jafar Jabbarly Street in Baku. Prior to his death, Ali Agha Shikhlinski wrote his memoirs "My Memories" in 1942. The book was published nine months after the general's death, in May 1944. A well-known Russian and Soviet military specialist, Doctor of Military Sciences, Major-General Evgeny Barsukov wrote a preface to the book. This book was published by "Azərnəşr" in Azerbaijani and Russian in 1984 with mass circulation (60 thousand) with additions and explanations.

The funeral of Ali Agha Shikhlinski, who died of cardiosclerosis in the hospital now named after Agha Musa Naghiyev on August 18, 1943, and was organized by philosopher Heydar Huseynov himself. The funeral was accompanied by an orchestra from the Baku Military Garrison.

Legacy 
A short biographical film named "The General", directed by Rauf Kazimovski, was released in 1970. An Azerbaijan Caspian Shipping Company tanker was named after him in 1980. There is a street in Baku and Gazakh named after him. By the decision of the Council of Ministers of the Azerbaijan SSR dated July 28, 1990, the sixth cotton collective farm in Sabirabad District and 135th secondary school, located in the seventh Micro-District of Baku, was named after him. There is a memorial bass-relief on the building that he lived in. On July 23, 1990, under the decree of the President of the Republic of Azerbaijan, "General Ali Agha Shikhlinski" scholarship was established for the students of higher education. In 1996, a descendant of the military commander, film director Zia Shikhlinski, made a short documentary film named "Was considered the god of artillery", which was aired on November 16, 2006, in Baku, organized with the assistance of the Russian Embassy in Azerbaijan. In 2014, President of Azerbaijan Ilham Aliyev signed an order on commemorating the 150th anniversary of General Ali Agha Shikhlinski.

A well-known Russian and Soviet military specialist, Doctor of Military Sciences Evgeny Barsukov wrote about him:

Ali Agha Shikhlinski was one of the characters of Russian-Soviet writer Alexander Nikolaevich Stepanov's "Port-Arthur" and "Zvonaryov Family" novels.

Films 
 The General (1970 film)
 Was Considered The God of Artillery
 Honorable Commander: General Ali Agha Shikhlinski

Honours and medals 

  3rd Class Order of Saint Stanislaus (1891)
  3rd Class Order of Saint Anne (1896)
  2nd Class Order of Saint Stanislaus with Swords (1901)
  2nd Class Order of Saint Anne (1904)
  Gold Sword for Bravery (1905)
  4th Class Order of Saint Anne for Bravery (1905)
  2nd Class Order of Saint Anne (1905)
  4th Class Order of Saint George (1905)
  4th Class Order of Saint Vladimir with Swords and Banners (1905)
  Russo-Japanese Silver War Medal (1907)
  The Highest Favor (1907)
  Bronze Medal "In memory of the 300th anniversary of the reign of the Romanov dynasty" (1913)
  Legion of Honour (1913) 
  3rd Class Order of Saint Vladimir (1913)
  1st Class Order of Saint Stanislaus (1915)
  1st Class Order of Saint Anne (1915)
  2nd Class Order of Saint Vladimir with Swords (1915)

Bibliography

Works 
 "Use of artillery in the battlefield" (1910)
 "A set of tasks for solving mountain and field artillery problems" (1916)
 "Russian-Azerbaijani brief military dictionary" (1926)
 "Worker-Peasant Red Army Artilleryman's Instructions" (1927)
 "My Memories" (1944)

Gallery

See also 
 Samad bey Mehmandarov
 Hasan bey Aghayev
 Nasib bey Yusifbeyli

Notes

Footnotes

Citations

External links
Russian Army in World War I (in Russian)

1865 births
1943 deaths
Shikhlinskis
People from Qazax District
Imperial Russian Army generals
Russian military personnel of the Russo-Japanese War
Russian military personnel of World War I
Azerbaijani people of World War I
Generals of the Azerbaijan Democratic Republic
Azerbaijani nobility
Azerbaijani memoirists
Recipients of the Order of Saint Stanislaus (Russian), 1st class
Recipients of the Order of Saint Stanislaus (Russian), 2nd class
Recipients of the Order of Saint Stanislaus (Russian), 3rd class
Recipients of the Order of St. George of the First Degree
Recipients of the Order of St. George of the Second Degree
Recipients of the Order of St. George of the Third Degree
Recipients of the Order of St. Vladimir, 2nd class
Recipients of the Order of St. Vladimir, 3rd class
Recipients of the Order of St. Vladimir, 4th class
Recipients of the Order of St. Anna, 1st class
Recipients of the Order of St. Anna, 2nd class
Recipients of the Order of St. Anna, 3rd class
Recipients of the Order of St. Anna, 4th class
Azerbaijani generals of Imperial Russian Army